Selection Project (stylized as SELECTION PROJECT) is a Japanese anime television series produced by Doga Kobo. It is based on Kadokawa's Idol x Audition x Reality Show multimedia project, which began in December 2019. It aired from October to December 2021.

Plot
Selection Project is an idol show in which aspiring idols from all across Japan compete to win a debut contract. In its seventh season, nine girls manage to win their regional auditions to compete on the main show. Among them are Suzune Miyama, a girl from north Kanto who had recently recovered from being hospitalized, and Rena Hananoi, the younger sister of the first season's winner, Akari Amasawa, who died three years prior in a truck accident.

Characters

Suzune is the 14-year-old representative candidate from Saitama Prefecture for the northern Kanto block. She is a bright and positive girl who grew up with a weak heart and spent most of her childhood in the hospital. However, she begins to idolize Akari Amasawa and strive to become a singer herself one day. She enters the Selection Project audition and originally lost due to her collapsing on stage, but later represents her block due to the withdrawal of her friend Seira. 

Rena is the 14-year-old representative candidate from Tokyo for the southern Kanto block. She strived to become an idol like her older sister, Akari Amasawa. However, her death caused Rena to develop a serious personality as she wants to be recognized not as Akari's sister but in her own right, going as far as adopting her maternal surname to distinguish from her late sister.

16 years old. Originated from Osaka Prefecture. The representative candidate for the Kinki block. Influenced by her two older brothers, Hiromi acts like a tomboy and hates to lose. She is especially popular with junior high girls in her hometown.

15 years old. Originated from Kōchi Prefecture. The representative candidate for the Shikoku block.

14 years old. Originated from Hokkaido. The representative candidate for the Hokkaido block.

13 years old. Originated from Hiroshima Prefecture. The representative candidate for the Chugoku block.

11 years old. Originated from Miyagi Prefecture. The representative candidate for the Tohoku block. Even though she has been an actress since kindergarten, she also wanted to be an idol.

14 years old. Originated from Aichi Prefecture. The representative candidate for the Chubu block. She comes from a rich family.

17 years old. Originated from Fukuoka Prefecture. The representative candidate for the Kyushu-Okinawa block.

15 years old. Originated from Gunma Prefecture. The representative candidate for the northern Kanto block. She is half American from her mother side. She is the original winner of the Northern Kanto representative, but later withdraws so that Suzune can compete.

 
The MC for Selection Project. He was previously a solo idol who became discouraged after his career stalled.

The legendary idol who won the first Selection Project. She lost her life in a truck accident three years prior to start of the story.

The dorm mother of the lodge the girls stay at for the duration of the contest.

Production
The project was named "Project Nyanco", which was a reference of Onyanko Club, when it was launched in 2018.

Media

Manga
A manga adaptation by Kōji Azuma began serialization in Square Enix's online manga magazine Manga UP! on July 11, 2021.

Anime
The series was announced by Kadokawa on December 4, 2020. The series was directed by Daisuke Hiramaki and written by Yūya Takahashi, with character designs by Kanna Hirayama, and music composed by Takurō Iga. It aired from October 1 to December 24, 2021 on AT-X, Tokyo MX, KBS Kyoto, SUN, TVA, and BS11. 9-tie (pronounced as "cutie"), a group composed of the series' nine main cast members, performed the opening theme song "Glorious Days," as well as the ending theme song "Only one yell." Funimation licensed the series outside of Asia. Muse Communication licensed the series in South and Southeast Asia.

Episode list

Live concert
 SELECTION PROJECT 1st LIVE 〜Cheer for you!〜 (January 30, 2022)

Notes

References

External links
 Official website 
 

2021 anime television series debuts
AT-X (TV network) original programming
Crunchyroll anime
Doga Kobo
Gangan Comics manga
Japanese idols in anime and manga
Japanese webcomics
Kadokawa Dwango franchises
Muse Communication
Shōnen manga
Slice of life anime and manga
Webcomics in print